Sabadell is a city in Catalonia.

Sabadell may also refer to:

 Banco Sabadell, a bank
 CE Sabadell FC, a football club
 Sabadell Airport, next to the city of Sabadell, Catalonia